Shahr-e Viran (also Romanized as Shahr-e Vīrān and Shahr-e Veyrān; also known as Sharviran and Shahr-e Veyrūn) is a village in Liravi-ye Miyani Rural District, Imam Hassan District, Deylam County, Bushehr Province, Iran. At the 2006 census, its population was 19, in 5 families.

References 

Populated places in Deylam County